George Macaulay Trevelyan  (16 February 1876 – 21 July 1962) was a British historian and academic. He was a Fellow of Trinity College, Cambridge, from 1898 to 1903. He then spent more than twenty years as a full-time author. He returned to the University of Cambridge and was Regius Professor of History from 1927 to 1943. He served as Master of Trinity College from 1940 to 1951. In retirement, he was Chancellor of Durham University.

Trevelyan was the third son of Sir George Otto Trevelyan, 2nd Baronet, and great-nephew of Thomas Babington Macaulay. He espoused Macaulay's staunch liberal Whig principles in accessible works of literate narrative unfettered by scholarly neutrality, his style becoming old-fashioned in the course of his long and productive career. The  historian E. H. Carr considered Trevelyan to be one of the last historians of the Whig tradition.

Many of his writings promoted the Whig Party, an important British political movement from the 17th to the mid-19th centuries, as well as its successor, the Liberal Party. Whigs and Liberals believed the common people had a more positive effect on history than did royalty and that democratic government would bring about steady social progress.

Trevelyan's history is engaged and partisan. Of his Garibaldi trilogy, "reeking with bias", he remarked in his essay "Bias in History", "Without bias, I should never have written them at all. For I was moved to write them by a poetical sympathy with the passions of the Italian patriots of the period, which I retrospectively shared."

Early life

Trevelyan was born into late Victorian Britain in Welcombe House, Stratford-on-Avon, the large house and estate owned by his maternal grandfather, Robert Needham Philips, a wealthy Lancashire merchant and the Liberal Member of Parliament (MP) for Bury. Today Welcombe is a hotel and spa for tourists visiting Shakespeare's birthplace. On his paternal side, he was the son of Sir George Trevelyan, 2nd Baronet, who had served as Secretary for Scotland, under Liberal Prime Ministers William Gladstone, and the Earl of Rosebery, and the grandson of Sir Charles Trevelyan, 1st Baronet, who had served as a civil servant and had faced considerable criticism for his and the British government's handling of the Great Famine of Ireland.

Trevelyan's parents used Welcombe as a winter resort after they inherited it in 1890. They looked upon Wallington Hall, the Trevelyan family estate in Northumberland, as their real home. George traced his father's steps to Harrow School and then Trinity College, Cambridge. After attending Wixenford and Harrow, where he specialised in history, Trevelyan studied at Trinity College, Cambridge, where he was a member of the secret society, the Cambridge Apostles and founder of the still existing Lake Hunt, a hare and hounds chase where both hounds and hares are human. In 1898, he won a fellowship at Trinity with a dissertation that was published the following year as England in the Age of Wycliffe. One professor at the university, Lord Acton, enchanted the young Trevelyan with his great wisdom and his belief in moral judgement and individual liberty.

Garibaldi
Trevelyan made his own reputation by depicting Italian patriot Giuseppe Garibaldi as a great hero who stood for British ideals of liberty. According to David Cannadine:
[Trevelyan's] great work was his Garibaldi trilogy (1907–11), which established his reputation as the outstanding literary historian of his generation. It depicted Garibaldi as a Carlylean hero—poet, patriot, and man of action—whose inspired leadership created the Italian nation. For Trevelyan, Garibaldi was the champion of freedom, progress, and tolerance, who vanquished the despotism, reaction, and obscurantism of the Austrian empire and the Neapolitan monarchy. The books were also notable for their vivid evocation of landscape (Trevelyan had himself followed the course of Garibaldi's marches), for their innovative use of documentary and oral sources, and for their spirited accounts of battles and military campaigns.

Historian Lucy Voakes argues that his Garibaldi project was part of a larger movement among English intellectuals to consolidate, celebrate and sometimes to critique liberal culture and politics. She sees Trevelyan's conception of the hero, and his study of the Italian Risorgimento emerging from his promotion of a distinctly 'English' patriotism based upon Whig gradualism, parliamentary monarchy and a hierarchical anti-republicanism.

Role in education
Trevelyan lectured at Cambridge until 1903 at which point he left academic life to become a full-time writer. In 1927 he returned to the university to take up a position as Regius Professor of Modern History, where the single student whose doctorate he agreed to supervise was J. H. Plumb (1936). During his professorship he was also familiar with Guy Burgess – he gave a positive reference for Burgess when he applied for a post at the BBC in 1935, describing him as a "first rate man", but also stating that "He has passed through the communist measles that so many of our clever young men go through, and is well out of it". In 1940 he was appointed as Master of Trinity College and served in the post until 1951 when he retired.

Trevelyan declined the presidency of the British Academy but served as chancellor of Durham University from 1950 to 1958. Trevelyan College at Durham University is named after him. He won the 1920 James Tait Black Memorial Prize for the biography Lord Grey of the Reform Bill, was elected a fellow of the British Academy in 1925, made a fellow of the Royal Society in 1950, and was an honorary doctor of many universities including Cambridge.

Place in British ideas

Shocked by the horrors of the Great War he saw as an ambulance driver just behind the front lines, Trevelyan became more appreciative of conservatism as a positive force, and less insistent that progress was inevitable. In History of England (1926), he searched for the deepest meaning of English history. Cannadine says he reported they were "the nation's evolution and identity: parliamentary government, the rule of law, religious toleration, freedom from continental interference or involvement, and a global horizon of maritime supremacy and imperial expansion".

Cannadine concluded in G.M. Trevelyan: A Life in History (1992):
During the first half of the twentieth century Trevelyan was the most famous, the most honored, the most influential and the most widely read historian of his generation. He was a scion of the greatest historical dynasty that (Britain) has ever produced. He knew and corresponded with many of the greatest figures of his time... For fifty years, Trevelyan acted as a public moralist, public teacher and public benefactor, wielding unchallenged cultural authority among the governing and the educated classes of his day.

Once called "probably the most widely read historian in the world; perhaps in the history of the world." Trevelyan saw how two world wars shook the belief in progress. Historiography had changed and the belief in progress declined. Roy Jenkins argued:

On the other hand, J. H. Plumb argued:

Other activities
During World War I he commanded a British Red Cross ambulance unit on the Italian front; his defective eyesight meant he was unfit for military service. On December 24, 1915, he was personally decorated by king Victor Emmanuel III of Italy with the Silver Medal of Military Valor for having bravely cleared out a military hospital made target of Austro-Hungarian fire.

In 1919 he delivered the British Academy's Italian Lecture.

Trevelyan was the first president of the Youth Hostels Association and the YHA headquarters are called Trevelyan House in his honour. He worked tirelessly through his career on behalf of the National Trust, in preserving not merely historic houses, but historic landscapes. He was an International Honorary Member of the American Academy of Arts and Sciences (1931) and an International Member of the American Philosophical Society.

Trevelyan's works
G.M. Trevelyan was a prolific author:
England in the Age of Wycliffe, 1368–1520 (1899). His first book, based on his PhD thesis. The title of this work is somewhat misleading, since it concentrates on the political, social and religious conditions of England during the later years of Wycliffe's life only. Six of the nine chapters are devoted to the years 1377–1385, while the last two treat the history of the Lollards from 1382 until the Reformation. The work is critical of Roman Catholicism in favor of Wycliffe.
England Under the Stuarts (1904). Covers 1603 to 1714.
The Poetry and Philosophy of George Meredith (1906).
Garibaldi's Defence of the Roman Republic (1907). This volume marks the entry of a new foreign historian in the field of Italian Risorgimento, a period much neglected, or, unworthily treated, outside of Italy.
Garibaldi and the Thousand (1909).
Garibaldi and the Making of Italy (1911). 
The Life of John Bright (1913).
 Clio, A Muse and Other Essays (1913).
Scenes From Italy's War (1919).
The Recreations of an Historian (1919).
Lord Grey of the Reform Bill (1920).
British History in the Nineteenth Century, 1782–1901 (1922).
Manin and the Venetian Revolution of 1848 (1923).
History of England (1926; 3rd edition, 1945).
Select Documents for Queen Anne's Reign, Down to the Union with Scotland 1702-7 (ed., 1929)
England Under Queen Anne (3 vols.) (1930–4) His magnum opus in 3 volumes: "Blenheim" (1930), "Ramillies and the Union with Scotland" (1932), "Peace and the Protestant Succession" (1934).
Sir George Otto Trevelyan: A Memoir (1932).
Grey of Fallodon (1937).
The English Revolution, 1688–1689 (1938). Portrays James II as a tyrant whose excesses led directly to the Glorious Revolution, becoming a standard work.
A Shortened History of England (1942).
English Social History: A Survey of Six Centuries: Chaucer to Queen Victoria (1942 US and Canada, 1944 UK). . Published during the darkest days of World War Two, it painted a nostalgic picture of England's glorious past as the beacon of liberty and progress, stirring patriotic feelings and becoming his best selling book, also his last major history book.
Trinity College: An Historical Sketch (1943). 
History and the Reader (1945).
An Autobiography and Other Essays (1949). 
Carlyle: An Anthology (1953).
A Layman's Love of Letters (1954).

See also

 Historiography of the United Kingdom
 Liberalism in the United Kingdom

References

Further reading
 Adams, Edward. Liberal Epic: The Victorian Practice of History from Gibbon to Churchill (U of Virginia Press, 2011).
 Cannadine, David. G. M. Trevelyan: A Life in History, 1998.
 Cannadine, David. GM Trevelyan: a historian in tune with his time, and ours (21 July 2012)
 Hernon, Joseph M. "The Last Whig Historian and Consensus History: George Macaulay Trevelyan, 1876-1962." American Historical Review 81.1 (1976): 66–97. online
 Rowse, A. L. Historians I Have Known. London: Duckworth, 1995, 1–11.
 Voakes, Lucy Turner. "The Risorgimento and English literary history, 1867–1911: the liberal heroism of Trevelyan's Garibaldi." Modern Italy 15.4 (2010): 433–450. online
 Winkler, Henry R. "George Macaulay Trevelyan" in E. William Helperin, ed., Some 20th-Century Historians (1961) pp 31–56.

External links

 
 
 Mitchell McNaylor, "G.M. Trevelyan"
 The Master of Trinity at Trinity College, Cambridge, Internet website .
 

1876 births
1962 deaths
Alumni of Trinity College, Cambridge
Chancellors of Durham University
Commanders of the Order of the British Empire
English autobiographers
English biographers
English historians
English memoirists
Fellows of the British Academy
Fellows of the Royal Society (Statute 12)
Historians of England
Historians of Italy
James Tait Black Memorial Prize recipients
Macaulay family of Lewis
Masters of Trinity College, Cambridge
Members of the Order of Merit
Members of the University of Cambridge faculty of history
People educated at Harrow School
People educated at Wixenford School
Social historians
Trevelyan College
Younger sons of baronets
Regius Professors of History (Cambridge)
Members of the American Philosophical Society